The 12231/32 Lucknow Charbagh–Chandigarh Express is a Superfast Express train belonging to Indian Railways – Northern Railways zone that runs between  and  in India.

It operates as train number 12231 from Lucknow Charbagh to Chandigarh and as train number 12232 in the reverse direction.

Coaches

The 12231/32 Lucknow Charbagh–Chandigarh Express presently has 2 AC 2 tier, 3 AC 3 tier, 6 Sleeper class, 6 Second Class seating & 2 SLR (seating cum luggage rake) coaches.

As with most train services in India, coach composition may be amended at the discretion of Indian Railways depending on demand.

Service

The 12231/32 Lucknow Charbagh–Chandigarh Express covers the distance of 666.8 kilometres in 11 hours 30 mins as 12231 Lucknow–Chandigarh Express (58.00 km/hr) & in 11 hrs 45 mins as 12232 Chandigarh–Lucknow Express (56.77 km/hr).

As the average speed of the train is above 55 km/hr, as per Indian Railways rules, its fare includes a Superfast surcharge.

Routeing

Traction

As the entire route is electrified, a Ghaziabad-based WAP-5 powers the train for its entire journey.

Timetable

12231 Lucknow Charbagh–Chandigarh Express leaves Lucknow on a daily basis at 22:30 hrs IST and reaches Chandigarh at 10:00 hrs IST the next day.
12232 Chandigarh–Lucknow Charbagh Express leaves Chandigarh on a daily basis at 20:50 hrs IST and reaches Lucknow at 08:35 hrs IST the next day.

See also 

 
 
 Lucknow Junction–Chandigarh Express

External links

References 

Passenger trains originating from Lucknow
Rail transport in Chandigarh
Express trains in India
Rail transport in Haryana
Rail transport in Uttarakhand